The Amateur Poker Association & Tour (APAT) is an organisation founded in 2006 and is Europe's largest organisation for recreational poker players, with a membership of over 20,000 players.

The Association element of the organisation is focused on consulting with gaming and industry bodies to enhance the player experience; with standardisation of rules, player friendly structures and event sponsorship at the top of its agenda.

The Tour element is primarily aimed at organising live poker tournaments in licensed venues across the United Kingdom, Ireland and other European countries. APAT has also hosted the APAT North American Amateur Poker Championship at the world famous Caesars Palace Casino in Las Vegas.  APAT’s principal live events are differentiated from other organised Poker Tournaments in the UK by being fully dealer-dealt and featuring deep stacked, well-structured tournaments for a modest entry fee.

Tournaments 
All principal APAT Tour events are run to APAT’s standardised rules, with blind structures targeted on providing value for the players. Tour events are reported, in real time, via APAT’s websites and have also been streamed live via the internet for online viewing.

In addition, APAT organises a series of Online Poker Championship events and the APAT National Online League via its headline gaming sponsors.  In 2012, APAT has announced the PokerStars.com National Online League.

Additional products

World Championship of Amateur Poker (WCOAP)
The WCOAP is a five-day festival of poker which features a three-day World Amateur Poker Championship main event together with additional World Amateur Poker Championship side events. Side events include the World Amateur Team Championship and tournaments in other poker variants such as Stud, H.O.R.S.E. and Omaha and other formats such as Heads Up and Six Max.

Poker Circuit
Poker Circuit is an online news aggregator pulling together news from poker sites, operators, poker forums and players.

APAT Cash Tour
APAT test-trialled a cash tournament at the APAT European Amateur Championship (Season 6) event held in Brighton in late January 2012.

National Amateur Champions

Season 1

Season 2

Season 3

Season 4

Season 5

Headline Gaming Sponsors
 Season 1: PokerStars
 Season 2: Blue Square
 Season 3: Blue Square
 Season 4: Betfair
 Season 5: 888poker
 Season 6: William Hill
 Season 7: Coral Poker
 Season 8: Coral Poker
 Season 9: Coral Poker
 Season 10: Grosvenor Casinos
 Season 11: Grosvenor Casinos
 Season 12: Grosvenor Casinos

Officials

 Managing Director:  Des Duffy
 Chairman: Tony Kendall
 Director of Live Events: Richard Prew

References

External links
 Official site
 casino slot games
 Hendon Mob Database: APAT Section

Poker tournaments
Poker in Europe
Organizations established in 2006